Hrob is a town in Teplice District in the Ústí nad Labem Region of the Czech Republic. It has about 2,000 inhabitants.

Administrative parts
The town part of Verneřice and villages of Křižanov and Mlýny are administrative parts of Hrob.

Etymology
The word hrob means "grave" in modern Czech, but this is just a coincidence. The original German name was Grap, later modified to Grab and transcribed into Czech as Hrob. The word grap was probably a term for a prospector's trench for search of silver ores.

Geography
The southern part of the municipal territory with the built-up area lies in the Most Basin, the northern part lies in the Ore Mountains. Artificial lakes Otakar and Barbora are located south of the town.

History
The first written mention of Hrob is from 1282.

Sights
The most notable building is the Church of Saint Barbara. The original Gothic church was founded in 1228, but was damaged during the Hussite Wars and destroyed during the Thirty Years' Wars. It was then renewed in 1637 and rebuilt into its current pseudo-Gothic form in the 19th century.

Gallery

References

External links

Cities and towns in the Czech Republic
Populated places in Teplice District
Towns in the Ore Mountains